"I Can't Remember" is a song written by Bill and Bette Anderson, and recorded as a single by American country artist, Connie Smith. It was produced by Bob Ferguson and was released on her 1965 album, Cute 'n' Country. The song was released in April 1965, reaching the Top 5 on the Billboard country music chart, becoming her third Top 10 hit. It was Smith's third single released under the RCA Victor label.

Background and content 
"I Can't Remember" was the third single written by Bill Anderson, however with this song, it was co-written with his first wife, Bette Anderson. It was recorded in Nashville, Tennessee March 17, 1965 at RCA Victor's Studio B. The session was produced by Bob Ferguson (who also produced her three other singles) and was backed by Nashville's "A-Team" of musicians, which included Charlie McCoy on bass guitar, Hargus "Pig" Robbins on piano, and part of Anderson's touring band, The Po' Boys. The song's female narrator explains how her lover called her late at night explaining he must leave town. Although he had told her where he was going, the woman could not remember, "but can't forget he's gone." The song's first chorus explains its storyline:

Did he say Sunday noon or one day soon
I think he left with Dan, but what if he said AnnDid they go to meet a train or leave to catch a planeI can't remember but I can't forget he's goneLike her previous two singles released, "I Can't Remember" featured Smith performing the song's guitar accompaniment, as well as singing lead vocals.

 Chart performance 
"I Can't Remember" was released in April 1965, one month after its recording session, becoming her third single released on RCA Victor Records. The song became Smith's third Top 10 hit in a row, peaking at #9 on the Billboard Magazine Hot Country Songs chart, while also peaking on the Bubbling Under Hot 100. It was issued on Smith's second RCA Victor album, Cute 'n' Country'' in October 1965 and was the only single spawned from the album. The song was a series of singles written by Bill Anderson, who had written Smith's prior hits, "Once a Day" and "Then and Only Then."

Charts

References 

1965 singles
Songs written by Bill Anderson (singer)
Connie Smith songs
Song recordings produced by Bob Ferguson (musician)
1965 songs
RCA Victor singles